Wien Floridsdorf (German for Vienna Floridsdorf) is a railway station located in the Floridsdorf district of Vienna, Austria. Opened in 1961, it is owned and operated by the Austrian Federal Railways (ÖBB), and is served by both regional and S-Bahn trains.

References

Notes

Bibliography

External links 

Floridsdorf
Buildings and structures in Floridsdorf
Railway stations opened in 1961